Rood End railway station was on the former Great Western route from Birmingham Snow Hill to Stourbridge Junction. The station opened in 1867 and closed some 18 years later. It was located about one mile north of the current Langley Green railway station. The line is still in use, although there is no sign of the former station.

References

Disused railway stations in Sandwell
Railway stations in Great Britain opened in 1867
Railway stations in Great Britain closed in 1885
Former Great Western Railway stations